Polish 3rd Infantry Division can refer to several formations of that name:
Polish 3rd Legions Infantry Division (interwar period)
Polish 3rd Infantry Division (France), 1940
Polish 3rd Infantry Division (Armia Krajowa), 1944
Polish 3rd Carpathian Rifle Division (Polish Armed Forces in the West)
Polish 3rd Infantry Division (Traugutt) (Polish Armed Forces in the East and later communist Polish People's Army)